The Shijiazhuang–Wuhan high-speed railway, or Shiwu passenger railway, is an  high-speed rail line operated by China Railway High-speed between Shijiazhuang and Wuhan, the provincial capitals of Hebei and Hubei, respectively. Construction commenced in October 2008, with a total investment of 116.76 billion yuan. It is part of the Jingguang passenger-dedicated line, a high-speed railway connecting Beijing and Guangzhou, which runs parallel to the older conventional Jingguang Railway.

The railway crosses the Yangtze in Wuhan over the Tianxingzhou Bridge, which was opened in December 2009.

Track-laying commenced on 29 November 2010.

Early on, it was reported that the Zhengzhou-Wuhan section was to enter service on 1 July 2012; however, later on the date was moved back to the end of September 2012. Trial runs on this section began on 26 August.

As of its opening day, published schedules show a number of G-series trains running from the new Zhengzhou East railway station via Wuhan to Guangzhou. There are also some G-series trains from Wuhan to Zhengzhou railway station, where a convenient connection to the frequent service on the Zhengzhou–Xi'an high-speed railway is possible. A few direct trains from Xi'an North railway station to Guangzhou South and Shenzhen North (e.g. G824/G821 via Zhengzhou or G838/G835 via Zhengzhou East),
over the Zhengzhou–Xi'an high-speed railway and the Shijiazhiuang-Wuhan-Guangzhou line, have been introduced as well.

The entire Shijiazhuang–Wuhan line was put into service by the end of 2012.

Although the railway's southern end point is notionally Wuhan railway station, a small number of high-speed trains from Beijing terminate at Hankou railway station instead. This is convenient for trains to transfer to the Shanghai–Wuhan–Chengdu high-speed railway, e.g. for passengers traveling toward Yichang, Chongqing or Chengdu.

References

High-speed railway lines in China
 
Railway lines opened in 2012